Mota Kotarna is a village in the Mehsana district of Gujarat in Western India.

History 
Princely state of Mota Kotarna was a Seventh Class taluka and princely state, also comprising two more villages. It was part of the Gadhwara thana in Mahi Kantha Agency and ruled by Koli chieftains of Chauhan dynasty.

It had a combined population of 829 in 1901, yielding a state revenue of 576 Rupees (1903-4, mostly from land) and contributing to the tributes due by Satlasna and Bhalusna, to both of which talukas Mota Kotarna was subordinated, to the Gaekwar Baroda State viz. to Idar State.

References

Sources and external links 
Imperial Gazetteer, on dsal.uchicago.edu - Mahi Kantha
 Gazetteer of the Bombay Presidency ..., Volume 5

Villages in Mehsana district
Princely states of Gujarat